Françoise Imbert (born September 16, 1947) is a French politician. She was the member of the National Assembly of France from 1997 to 2017 for  Haute-Garonne's 5th constituency,  as a member of the Socialiste, radical, citoyen et divers gauche.

References

1947 births
Living people
Socialist Party (France) politicians
Women members of the National Assembly (France)
Deputies of the 12th National Assembly of the French Fifth Republic
Deputies of the 13th National Assembly of the French Fifth Republic
Deputies of the 14th National Assembly of the French Fifth Republic
21st-century French women politicians